The 1864 United States presidential election in Nevada took place on November 8, 1864, as part of the 1864 United States presidential election. Nevada voters chose three electors of the Electoral College, two of whom voted for president and vice president.

Nevada voted in its first ever presidential election in 1864, having become the 36th state just eight days before the election (on October 31). The state was won by the incumbent President Abraham Lincoln (R-Illinois), running with former Senator and Military Governor of Tennessee Andrew Johnson, with 59.84% of the popular vote, against the 4th Commanding General of the United States Army George B. McClellan (D–New Jersey), running with Representative George H. Pendleton, with 40.16% of the vote.

Due to one of the electors getting snowbound and there being no law to replace him, this election is one of three occasions (as of March 2023) where only two electoral votes were cast by a state or district in a presidential election: the others were in Mississippi in 1820, as one of the state's three electors died before the Electoral College convened and there was insufficient time to find a replacement, and the District of Columbia in 2000, as one of the district's three electors abstained.

Results

See also
 United States presidential elections in Nevada

References

Nevada
1864
1864 Nevada elections